The Lincolnshire Formation, often known as the Lincolnshire Limestone, is an Ordovician-age geological formation in the Appalachian region of the Eastern United States.

References 

Ordovician geology of Virginia